Xylastodoris is a genus of true bugs in the family Thaumastocoridae. There are at least two described species in Xylastodoris.

Species
These two species belong to the genus Xylastodoris:
 Xylastodoris gerdae Bechly & Wittmann, 2000
 Xylastodoris luteolus Barber, 1920 (royal palm bug)

References

Further reading

 
 

Cimicomorpha
Articles created by Qbugbot